Catherine Christer Hennix (also known as C.C. Hennix, born 1948) is a Swedish musician, poet, philosopher, mathematician and visual artist. As a musician, she has worked with figures such as Pandit Pran Nath, La Monte Young, and Henry Flynt. Several of her archival recordings have been released in the 21st century, most prominently The Electric Harpsichord (2010). Hennix was affiliated with MIT's AI Lab in the late 1970s and was later employed as research professor of mathematics at SUNY New Paltz; she also worked with mathematician Alexander Esenin-Volpin.

Biography
Catherine Christer Hennix grew up in a musical environment; her mother was a jazz composer who frequently invited well-known American jazz musicians such as Idrees Sulieman and Eric Dolphy around the house, and she saw John Coltrane and others perform. Hennix took up drums and performed with her brother. Later, Hennix studied with Stockhausen and was among the pioneers in Sweden experimenting with main-frame computer generated composite sound wave forms in the late 1960s. She studied bio-chemistry and then linguistics at university before settling on mathematical logic and philosophy. 

In the 1970s, she connected with Fluxus artists Dick Higgins and Allison Knowles in New York, and began collaborative relationships with figures such as La Monte Young and Henry Flynt. She pursued studies with raga master Pandit Pran Nath and led the just intonation live-electronic ensembles Hilbert Hotel and The Deontic Miracle. At the urging of Nath, she also pursued a career as a professor of mathematics and computer science, and assistant to and coauthor with Alexander Esenin-Volpin for which she was given the Centenary Prize Fellow Award by the Clay Mathematics Institute in 2000. She was affiliated with MIT's AI Lab in the late 1970s and was later employed as research professor of mathematics at SUNY New Paltz. In the 1990s, she relocated to Paris to study psychoanalysis with students of Jacques Lacan.

Hennix's interest in drone music is crossed with her interests in jazz, Arabic music, Sufi Islamic art, and blues elements. In the 1970s and 1980s, she played with musicians such as Arthur Russell and Arthur Rhames. She also performed in Flynt's group Dharma Warriors. Archival recordings such as The Electric Harpsichord (2010) and Selected Early Keyboard Works (2018) saw release in the 21st century. In recent years, she has performed with her group the Chora(s)san Time-Court Mirage. In 2019, many of her writings were published in the two-volume collection Poësy Matters and Other Matters.

Bibliography
"Notes on Toposes and Adjoints" (1976)
"Notes on Intuitionisitc Modal Music" (1976)
"Intensional Logics for Intransitive Experiences" (1979)
"Parmenides on Intensional Logics" (1979)
"Poetry as Philosophy, Poetry as Notation" (1985)
"Philosophy of Concept Art" [co-authored with Flynt] (1989)
"Hors-texte '68–'88; Finis Universatum: Philosophy as Art/ Philosophy as Notation, II" (1989)
"Grammatica tua sit tibi in periditionem" (1992)
"Seminarium över La Sinthome och Mathémkonstent genealogik" (1994)
"Beware of the Gödel-Wette Paradox" – [co-authored with Esenin-Volpin] (2001)
Poësy Matters and Other Matters (2019)

List of works

"The Hashigakari Chord" (1973–) [infinitary composite sound wave]
"Central Palace Music" (1976–) [two amplified renaissance oboes, amplified sheng, sine waves]
"Netori / Hashigakari" (1976–) [amplified renaissance oboe, amplified sheng, sine waves]
"Waves of the Blue Sea" (1976–) [two amplified renaissance oboes, sine waves]
"The Electric Harpsichord" (1976–) [well-tuned Yamaha keyboard. sine waves] 
"Five Times Repeated Music" (1976–) [two amplified renaissance oboes, sine waves]
"Soliton(e) Star" (2003–) [infinitary composite sound wave] 
"Blues Dhkir al-Salam (Blues al Maqam)" (2011–)
"Rag Infinity/Rag Cosmosis" (2013–) (well-tuned Yamaha keyboard, computer, sine waves]
"Blues Alif Lam Mim" (2015–)
"For Brass and Computer" (2017) [trumpet, French horn, trombone, microtonal tuba and computer ]

Discography
Releases credited to Hennix and her various groups.

Solo recordings 
"Still Life, Q" (1969, Sveriges Radio)
The Electric Harpsichord (2010, Die Schachtel)
Live at Krems (2018, Important)
Selected Early Keyboard Works (2018, Blank Forms)
Unbegrenzt (2020, Blank Forms)

The Deontic Miracle 
Central Palace Music from 100 Model Subjects For Hegikan Roku (2016, Important)
Selections from 100 Models of Hegikan Roku (2019, Blank Forms)

Chora(s)san Time-Court Mirage 
Live at the Grimm Museum, Volume One (2012, Important)
Live at Issue Project Room (2016, Important)

Born of Six 
Svapiti (2013, Important)

Work with Henry Flynt 
You Are My Everlovin / Celestial Power (1986, Hundertmark) – tambura
Dharma Warriors (2008, Locust) – Henry Flynt / C.C. Hennix
C Tune (2002, Locust)  – tambura
Purified by the Fire (2005, Locust) – tambura
Glissando No. 1 (2011) – piano

References

External links
Recordings of Hennix's work taken from an eight-day festival organized in Spring 1976 at the Museum of Modern Art in Stockholm
C.C. Hennix on Important Records
C.C. Hennix on Die Schachtel
"Beware of the Gödel-Wette Paradox"
"For the 50th anniversary of John Coltrane’s A Love Supreme"

1948 births
Living people
American experimental musicians
20th-century classical composers
Experimental composers
Postmodern composers
American women classical composers
American classical composers
21st-century classical composers
Microtonal composers
Contemporary classical music performers
American people of Swedish descent
Pupils of Pran Nath (musician)
Pupils of La Monte Young
21st-century American composers
20th-century American women musicians
20th-century American composers
21st-century American women musicians
20th-century women composers
21st-century women composers